Survivor: Africa is the third season of the American CBS competitive reality television series Survivor. The season was filmed from July 11, 2001, to August 18, 2001, in Kenya's Shaba National Reserve, and was aired weekly from October 11, 2001, until the live finale on January 10, 2002.  Ethan Zohn was named Sole Survivor over Kim Johnson by a jury vote of 5–2, and won the $1,000,000 grand prize. The season featured a cast of 16 participants split between two tribes, Boran and Samburu. Three of the cast, Zohn, Lex van den Berghe, and Tom Buchanan all returned for future seasons.  The season received more criticism than previous seasons due to the harsh living conditions of the African desert and the small amount of food for participants.

Overview

Survivor is a reality television show created by Mark Burnett and Charlie Parsons and based on the Swedish show Expedition Robinson. The series follows a number of participants who are isolated in a remote location, where they must provide food, fire, and shelter for themselves. Every three days, one participant is removed from the series by majority vote, with challenges being held to give a reward (ranging from living and food-related prizes to a car) and immunity from being voted off the show. The last remaining player is awarded a prize of $1,000,000.

Filming of Survivor: Africa took place from July 11, 2001, to August 18, 2001, in Kenya's Shaba National Reserve. The show was broadcast from October 11, 2001, until January 10, 2002, on CBS.

Contestants
The show's cast consists of 16 players who are divided into tribes named Boran and Samburu for the real-life Borana and Samburu tribes. After 12 days, three members of each team switched to the other tribe in what became known as the first "twist" in Survivor. When 10 contestants remained, the two tribes were merged into the Moto Maji tribe, which was named for the Swahili words for "fire" and "water".

Future appearances
Since the broadcast of Survivor: Africa, Ethan Zohn competed again with Lex van den Berghe and Tom Buchanan on Survivor: All-Stars. Zohn also competed on Survivor: Winners at War. In 2015, Teresa Cooper was included on the public poll to choose the cast of Survivor: Cambodia but was not chosen to compete.

Outside the Survivor franchise, Zohn competed on a "Reality All-Stars" episode of Fear Factor, and also appeared on The Amazing Race 19 with then-girlfriend and fellow Survivor winner Jenna Morasca. In 2013, both van den Berghe and Buchanan were involved in the making of the television series Family Beef.

Season summary

The 16 castaways were split into tribes named Samburu and Boran, and were given camps that included fencing to help protect them from wildlife. Samburu took an early lead but the tribe was internally divided along age lines – Silas, Kim Powers, Brandon and Lindsey as one, and Frank, Teresa, Carl and Linda as the other. At their first Tribal Council, the age blocs left a stalemate tie between Carl and Lindsey, and with no previous votes to count, a quiz was used. Lindsay won and put the younger members in control. On the next visit to Tribal Council, Linda was eliminated and both tribes were even at six members. On Day 13, the tribes were given a vague clue about sending three members on a quest but were unaware this would be the first tribal swap. Silas picked himself and the remaining older Samburu, Frank and Teresa. Kelly, Big Tom, and Lex were picked for Boran. After being informed of the tribal swap, these players joined their new tribes; Frank and Teresa quickly went to work with the original Boran members to eliminate Silas while the original Boran members on Samburu learned of Lindsay's past votes and were able to eliminate her.

Once 10 players remained – six from the original Boran and four from Samburu – the tribes were merged into a single tribe called Moto Maji. Samburu members were aware that the Boran players were sticking with original alliances and scrambled to stay in. During the first post-merger tribal council, a mystery vote was cast for Lex, sending him on a witch hunt. Deciding it had been Kelly, a member of his alliance who had voted against him, Lex asked his alliance to turn against one of their own. When Kelly found out what was going to happen, she banded with the Samburu members, but Lex had also persuaded Brandon to vote with his alliance, leading to Kelly's elimination. Brandon's disloyalty to Samburu led to his elimination and that of the other remaining Samburu members.

The final four players were Ethan, Lex, Big Tom, and Kim Johnson. Kim won the last two immunity challenges, Tom was voted out, and then Lex was voted out by Kim's vote.  At the Final Tribal Council, Kim was praised for surviving the game but was accused of riding the coattails of Lex, Ethan, and Big Tom. Ethan was praised for his likeability and integrity, and the jury voted Ethan the Sole Survivor in a 5–2 vote.

{| class="wikitable nowrap" style="margin:auto; text-align:center"
|+Challenge winners and eliminations by episode
! scope="col" colspan="3"|Episode
! scope="col" colspan="2"|Challenge winner(s)
! colspan="2" |Eliminated
|-
! scope="col"|No.
! scope="col"|Title
! scope="col"|Original air date
! scope="col"|Reward
! scope="col"|Immunity
!Tribe
!Player
|-
!1
|align="left"|"Question of Trust"
|align="left"|October 11, 2001
| colspan=2 
|
|Diane
|-
!2
|align="left"|"Who's Zooming Whom?"
|align="left"|October 18, 2001
|
|
|
|Jessie
|-
!3
|align="left"|"The Gods Are Angry"
|align="left"|October 25, 2001
|
|
|
|Carl
|-
!4
|align="left"|"The Young and Untrusted"
|align="left"|November 1, 2001
|
|
|
|Linda
|-
!5
|align="left"|"The Twist"
|align="left"|November 8, 2001
|
|
|
|Silas
|-
!6
|align="left"|"I'd Never Do It To You"
|align="left"|November 15, 2001
|
|
|
|Lindsey
|-
!7
|align="left"|"Will There Be a Feast Tonight?"
|align="left"|November 22, 2001
||Teresa
|
|Clarence
|-
!8
|align="left"|"The First 21 Days"
|align="left"|November 29, 2001
| colspan="4" align="center" |Recap Episode|-
!9
|align="left"|"Smoking Out the Snake"
|align="left"|December 6, 2001
|Ethan[Lex]
|Ethan
| rowspan="7" 
|Kelly
|-
!10
|align="left"|"Dinner, Movie and a Betrayal"
|align="left"|December 13, 2001
|Brandon,Frank
|Lex
|Brandon
|-
!11
|align="left"|"We Are Family"
|align="left"|December 20, 2001
|
|Lex
|Frank
|-
!12
|align="left"|"The Big Adventure"
|align="left"|December 27, 2001
|Lex[Tom]
|Tom
|Kim P.
|-
!13
|align="left"|"Truth Be Told"
|align="left"|January 3, 2002
|Lex
|Lex
|Teresa
|-
! rowspan="2"|14
| rowspan="2" style="text-align:left;"|"The Final Four: No Regrets"
| rowspan="3" style="text-align:left;" |January 10, 2002
|rowspan=2 
|Kim J.
|Tom
|-
|Kim J.
|Lex
|-
!15
| style="text-align:left;" |"The Reunion"
| colspan="4" bgcolor="darkgray" |
|}In the case of multiple tribes or castaways who win reward or immunity, they are listed in order of finish, or alphabetically where it was a team effort; where one castaway won and invited others, the invitees are in brackets.Episodes

Voting history

Notes

ReceptionSurvivor: Africa received much more criticism than the two previous seasons, primarily for the contestants' tough living conditions during filming. Dalton Ross of Entertainment Weekly ranked it as the ninth-worst season of the series, saying aside from "Some great challenges, not that much else was great". Tom Santilli of Examiner.com ranked it 26th, saying following Borneo and Australian Outback, "it was a complete dud at the time", while noting winner Ethan Zohn "was just so-so and not that interesting", and that the cast's "lethargy showed on screen" due to the poor conditions in the filming location. In 2020, fan site "The Purple Rock Podcast" also ranked the season 29th, and said it "suffers because of its location" and that "the cast on this season is generally pretty decent, and probably would have been much better if they weren't constantly sapped of energy by lack of food and water". In 2015, a poll by Rob Has a Podcast ranked Survivor: Africa 19th out of 30 with Rob Cesternino ranking this season 26th. This was updated in 2021 during Cesternino's podcast "Survivor All-Time Top 40 Rankings", ranking Survivor: Africa 21st out of 40. In 2013, Andrea Deiher of Zap2it ranked the season the fifth-worst before it was replaced in 2015 by Survivor: San Juan del Sur.  In 2020, Inside Survivor ranked this season 23rd out of 40, saying; "Is it the most dynamic season in terms of gameplay? No. But it is rich in character."

Controversy
Controversy surrounded an immunity challenge in the final episode of Survivor: Africa''. In the "Fallen Comrades" challenge, in which the contestants were quizzed on trivia about their fellow players who had been voted out, the final question is "Which female contestant has no piercings?". The official answer, given by Kim Johnson to win the challenge, was Kelly. Lex answered "Lindsey", who, unbeknownst to the producers, also had no piercings. Had Lex been given credit for his correct answer, he and Kim would have tied and faced tie-breaker questions.  After the producers were alerted to the mistake, both third-place finisher Lex and fourth-place finisher Tom were awarded the $100,000 runner-up prize instead of the usual third- and-fourth-place earnings.

References

External links
 Official CBS Survivor Africa website

03
2001 in Kenya
2001 American television seasons
2002 American television seasons
Television shows filmed in Kenya